The Chaipattana Foundation is a non-government organization founded by King Bhumibol operating in Thailand since 1988, that develops projects of national and social benefit to the Thai people. The Foundation's aim is to provide prompt, timely, and necessary responses to problems affecting the people of Thailand. "Chaipattana" means Victory of Development.

Operations 
The foundation is not subject to the budgetary constraints or regulatory requirements of government agencies. The Foundation is officially registered as a legal entity at the Ministry of the Interior. All committee members have the freedom to consider and initiate work activities.

Projects

Agricultural development 
The foundation supports projects in:
Soil Solutions and Development
The New Theory
Integrated Farming

Environmental quality 
The foundation supports research on Vetiver, which is useful for habitat restoration and flood management.

Sustainable management of natural resources 
The group supports various sustainability projects:
Royally-Initiated Arboretum Project and Community Park
Mangrove Biodiversity Research and Study Project

References 

Foundations based in Thailand